Beck (born 1970) is an American singer and record producer.

Beck may also refer to:

Arts and entertainment
 Beck (film), a 1997 film
 Beck (Swedish TV series)
 Beck (UK TV series)
 Beck (album), a 1975 album by Joe Beck
 Beck (EP), a 2001 EP by Beck
 Beck (manga), a Japanese manga series, or its anime adaptation Beck: Mongolian Chop Squad

People
 Beck (surname), including a list of people with the name
 Beck baronets, an extinct title in the Baronetage of Great Britain
 Beck Bennett (born 1984), American actor, writer, and comedian
 Beck A. Taylor (fl. 2000s), American university president
 Beck Weathers (born 1946), American pathologist and survivor of the 1996 Mount Everest disaster
 Beck Oliver, a character from Nickelodeon's Victorious, portrayed by Canadian actor Avan Jogia
 Jeff Beck (1944–2023), British musician
 Ludwig August Theodor Beck (1880—1944), German general and Chief of Staff

Places
 Beck, Alabama, U.S.
 River Beck, in south London, England

Other uses
 Beck (bus maker), an American bus manufacturer
 Beck (stream), a small stream
 Beck Book Company (Beck's), forerunner of Wakefield Press, Adelaide, South Australia
 Beck Motorsports, an American auto racing team
 Beck Theatre, a theatre in London, England

See also
 Bec (disambiguation)
 Becks (disambiguation)
 Beck's American Translation, a 1976 abbreviated Bible translation
 Beek (disambiguation), Dutch related word
 Bek (disambiguation)